El Candidato (in English, The Candidate) is a Mexican political thriller streaming television series created by Peter Blake and produced by Televisa for Amazon Prime Video.

The main cast of the series consists of James Purefoy, José María de Tavira, Eréndira Ibarra, Joaquín Cosío and Esmeralda Pimentel.

The series trailer was released on 15 July 2020. The series premiered on 17 July 2020 on Amazon Prime Video.

Plot
Rookie CIA field operative Isabel Alfaro works alongside infamous CIA legend Wayne Addison to bring down Rafael Bautista, Mexico's most vicious and brilliant narco. Her mission brings her into conflict with Eduardo Yzaguirre, her former boyfriend and the current Mayor of Mexico City, the cleanest and most inspirational politician in the country.

Episodes

Cast

Critical Reception
The critical reception was very positive.

A week after its premiere, the Heraldo de Mexico newspaper wrote that the series had become one of the Mexican public’s favorites and was generating debate on social media about governmental corruption." 
Álvaro Cueva, writing in Milenio, called the series “magnificent” and wrote “I loved it, it moved me, it shocked me.” Alerta Qro called the show “one of the best series that our country has ever produced,” owing to its “great cast” and “intelligent and complex script.” GQ India called it “a gripping tale of power, money, hatred and love.” Techquila rated the series 9/10 and said that “El Candidato is a must-watch if you’re craving some fast-paced CIA action.”

References

External links

2020s Mexican drama television series
Spanish-language television shows
Spanish-language Amazon Prime Video original programming
Amazon Prime Video original programming
2020 Mexican television series debuts
Works about Mexican drug cartels